Traditions are customs practiced from one generation to the next.

Tradition or traditions may refer to:

Religion
 Tradition (Anglicanism), a school of thought within Anglican Christianity
 Tradition, a lineage or denomination of Wicca
 Sacred tradition, the deposit of faith on which some Christian churches' dogma is based
 Tradition (perennialism), divinely ordained truths according to the Traditionalist philosophers
 Traditionalist School, the school of thought incorporating the perennial philosophy

Arts, entertainment, and media
 Tradition (film), a 2016 short film
 Traditions, a 1955 Hong Kong film (List of Hong Kong films of 1955)
 Tradition (band), a United Kingdom-based reggae band
 Tradition (Michael Angelo Batio album), 1998
 Tradition (Doc Watson album), 1977
 "Tradition" (song), the opening number of Fiddler on the Roof
 Tradition (journal), a quarterly journal of Orthodox Jewish thought
 Traditions (Mage: The Ascension), an alliance of secret societies in the Mage: the Ascension role-playing game
 A defunct Swedish chain of game stores, owned by Target Games
 The Tradition (poetry collection), a 2019 poetry collection by Jericho Brown

Other uses
The Tradition, an American professional golf event
Tradition, a barley variety

See also 
 Trad (disambiguation)